Tee Chee Keong Benjamin is a Singaporean scientist. He helped to co-develop the electronic skin technology when he was a PhD student in Stanford University. In 2015, he was chosen as one of TR35 list (MIT Technology Review's global 35 Innovators Under 35) for his work on e-skin. The only Singaporean on the 2015 TR35 list, e-skins could potentially make prosthetic limbs as sensitive as human ones and enable intuitive human machine interactions. In 2019, he co-developed an underwater self-healing transparent material that could be useful in marine environments.

Career 
Tee is currently associate professor (tenured) at the National University of Singapore's Department of Material Science and Engineering. He was the President's assistant professor between 2017 and 2021. He is also an adjunct scientist at the Agency for Science, Technology and Research's Institute of Materials Research and Engineering (A*STAR's IMRE) .

Education 
BS (Summa cum laude) Electrical Engineering, University of Michigan-Ann Arbor, 2006
MS Electrical Engineering, Stanford University, 2007
PhD Electrical Engineering, Stanford University, 2014

Awards 
2005 Undergraduate Outstanding Research Award 
2010 TSMC Outstanding Student Research Gold Award  
2010 TSMC Outstanding Student Research Academy  
2013 MRS Graduate Student Gold Award 
2014 Singapore-Stanford Biodesign Global Innovation Fellow
2015 One of 10 finalists TR35 APAC list
2015 One of 35 Innovators Under 35 TR35 list by MIT Technology Review
2016 Singapore Young Scientist Award
2019 World Economic Forum Young Scientist

Selected publications 
A transparent, self-healing and high-κ dielectric for low-field-emission stretchable optoelectronics, YJ Tan, H. Godaba, G. Chen, STM Tan, GX Wan, G. Li, PM Lee, Y. Cai, S. Li, R. F. Shepherd, J. S Ho, B. C-K. Tee*, Nature Materials, (2020). 
A neuro-inspired artificial peripheral nervous system for scalable electronic skins, WW Lee, YJ Tan, H Yao, S Li, HH See, M Hon, B Xiong, K Ng, J Ho, B. C-K. Tee*, Science Robotics, (2019). Featured as Cover.
Self-healing electronic skins for aquatic environments, Y Cao, YJ Tan, S Li, WW Lee, H Guo, Y Cai, C Wang, B. C-K. Tee*, Nature Electronics, 2, (2019). Featured as Cover.
A Skin-Inspired Organic Digital Mechanoreceptor, B. C-K. Tee*, A. Chortos*, A. Berndt*, et al., Science, 350, 313–316 (2015). Featured on Science Magazine
Continuous Wireless Pressure Monitoring and Mapping with Ultra-Small Passive Sensors for Health Monitoring and Critical Care, L. Chen*, B. C-K. Tee*, et al., Nature Communications, 5, 5028, (2014)
An electrically and mechanically self-healing composite with pressure- and flexion-sensitive properties for electronic skin applications,  B. C-K. Tee*, C. Wang*, R. Allen, Z. Bao, Nature Nanotechnology, 7, 825–832 (2012) | Featured on Science Magazine, BBC, ABC, National Geography
Tunable Flexible Pressure Sensors using Microstructured Elastomer Geometries for Intuitive Electronics, B. C-K. Tee et al., Advanced Functional Materials 24, 5427–5434, (2014)
Highly sensitive flexible pressure sensors with micro-structured rubber dielectric layers, SCB Mannsfeld, B. C-K Tee, et al., Nature Materials 9, 859–864, (2010). Featured on Nature News and Views

References

External links 
 

Living people
Singaporean scientists
University of Michigan College of Engineering alumni
Year of birth missing (living people)
Stanford University School of Engineering alumni